Peter Dale may refer to:

 Peter Dale (poet) (born 1938), British poet and translator
 Peter Dale (Derbyshire) on the Limestone Way
 Peter Dale (swimmer) (born 1963), Australian swimmer
 Dale Wimbrow (1895–1954), musical recording artist also known as Peter Dale
 Peter J. Dale (1845–?), Wisconsin legislator

See also
 Peter Dale Scott (born 1929), Canadian poet and English professor

Dale, Peter